Acanthosaura titiwangsaensis, the Malayan Mountain horned agamid or Titiwangsa horned tree lizard, is a species of agama found in Malaysia.

References

titiwangsaensis
Reptiles of Malaysia
Reptiles described in 2009
Taxa named by Perry L. Wood
Taxa named by Jesse L. Grismer
Taxa named by Larry Lee Grismer
Taxa named by Nohrayati Ahmad
Taxa named by Aaron M. Bauer